The Saudi Investment Company (SICO), headquartered Geneva, Switzerland, and founded on May 19, 1980, represents the worldwide interests of the Saudi Binladin Group.

Overview 
The Geneva-based SICO is the parent house for the group's international financial activities and investments, with branches in London and Curaçao. The Curaçao branch, established in 1984, manages the bin Laden group's partnership with the American Daniels Realty Corporation (Duspic), part of the Fluor Corporation conglomerate. It is partly through the bin Ladens' influence that the Fluor group was one of the major recipients of reconstruction contracts in Kuwait.

Personnel 
The company is chaired by Yeslam bin Laden, a half-brother of the more infamous Osama bin Laden. Board members include Beatrice Dufour (a sister-in-law of Yeslam), the noted Swiss lawyer Baudoin Dunant, Charles Rochat and Tilouine el Hanafi.

Included among SICO's more notable business partners is the Pakistani businessman Akberali Moawalla, who, on December 5, 2001, came under the scrutiny of French investigative authorities for his role in a €241 million transfer made to Pakistan in 2000 from an account belonging to a company called Cambridge, an SBG subsidiary, that was opened at Deutsche Bank in Geneva, according to the Le Monde. U.S. authorities were aware of the existence of those funds, which they believe were transferred into an account belonging jointly to Osama bin Laden and someone of Pakistani nationality, according to the French paper.

References

External links 
 SICO at CooperativeResearch

Bin Laden family
Conglomerate companies of Saudi Arabia
Companies based in Geneva
Financial services companies established in 1980
Swiss companies established in 1980
Saudi Arabian companies established in 1980